The Zastava M72 is a light machine gun developed and manufactured by then Yugoslav Zastava Arms company. The M72 was patterned after the Soviet RPK light machine gun.

Overview
The Zastava M72 chambers and fires the 7.62×39mm M67 round. It is a gas-operated, air-cooled, drum-fed firearm with a fixed stock.

This weapon is a near copy of the Soviet RPK light machine gun. There are a few differences on the M72/M72A. It does not have a scope side rail mount, the butt is also different, having the shape of a regular AK-47 rifle. It has a reinforced receiver, night sights and no carrying handle. The barrel also differs from other RPK rifles because of the cooling fins to help with heat dissipation from prolonged fire. The M72 only appears with a heavy profile barrel as opposed to Russian and Romanian RPK rifles that can come in both light or heavy barrel configurations.

Variants
M72 - Standard version with a fixed wooden stock. Utilizes a milled receiver.
M72B1 - Same as the M72, but with an updated stamped receiver instead of the milled receiver.
M72AB1 - Same as the M72B1, but with a folding stock and detachable bipod.
Al Quds - Iraqi Licensed produced variant.

A semi automatic variant of the M72B1 is produced in the United States using original parts kits with a US made receiver and barrel.

Design details
The Zastava M72/M72A is a gas-operated, air-cooled, drum-fed, selective fire, shoulder-fired weapon with a bipod. It is a squad automatic weapon, like the Soviet RPK but has unique design features.

Users

Non-state users
Oromo Liberation Front
Taliban

References

External links

Zastava M72B1

M72
7.62×39mm machine guns
Light machine guns
Kalashnikov derivatives
Machine guns of Yugoslavia
Infantry weapons of the Cold War
Zastava Arms
Military equipment introduced in the 1970s